Allium juldusicola is a rare species of wild onion apparently endemic to western part of Xinjiang Province in China.

Allium juldusicola produces a single egg-shaped bulb about 15 mm in diameter. Scape is up to 30 cm tall. Leaves are flat, very narrow. Umbel is spherical, with a large number of white flowers.

References

juldusicola
Onions
Flora of Xinjiang
Plants described in 1879